"Complicated Disaster" is a song that was recorded by rock singer Tina Turner. It is a track from her 2004 greatest hits Compilation: All The Best. The song was released as a promotional single in Europe in 2005. "Complicated Disaster" was one of three new recordings from All The Best, the other two being "Something Special" and the previously released single "Open Arms".

Track listing and formats
European promotional CD single
"Complicated Disaster" – 3:43

References

Tina Turner songs
2005 singles
Songs written by Steve Robson
2004 songs
Parlophone singles
Song recordings produced by Steve Robson
Songs written by Michelle Escoffery